Master Sergeant Pedro Rodríguez (January 3, 1912 – October 19, 1999) was a U.S. Army soldier from Puerto Rico who earned two Silver Stars within a seven-day period during the Korean War.  He is one of the few U.S. Army soldiers and perhaps the only Puerto Rican soldier other than Brigadier General Antonio Rodríguez Balinas, Second Lieutenant Vidal Rodriguez-Amaro, and Sergeant First Class Felix G. Nieves to receive more than one Silver Star during the Korean War.  Rodríguez served in the 65th Infantry Regiment during both World War II and the Korean War; the 65th Infantry was awarded the Congressional Gold Medal in 2014.

Early years
Rodríguez was born Lajas, Puerto Rico, on January 3, 1912, into a poor family. Rodríguez did not have a formal education. His father owned an ox cart and earned a living by delivering goods to the town's merchants. Rodríguez rose early in the morning to help his father. Together they went to the railroad station, where they loaded the goods onto their ox cart and then delivered them. When he was 14 years old, his father died and he had to take over the ox cart and the financial responsibility of his family.  The economic situation became so bad that in 1937, when he was 25 years old, he joined the Puerto Rico National Guard.

World War II
Rodríguez was assigned to the 65th Infantry Regiment, the all Puerto Rican regiment and was stationed in Panama.  When World War II broke out, the 65th Infantry was sent to North Africa.  In September 1944, his company landed in Marseilles, France, and marched north into Germany without any major incident.

Korean War
After the war, the 65th Infantry was stationed in Puerto Rico. The 65th was activated to the U.S. Army was deployed to Korea attached to the 3rd Infantry Division, upon the outbreak of the Korean War on August 26, 1950.  By the time the "Borinqueneers", as the 65th was known, reached Korea, Rodríguez had been promoted to the rank of sergeant.

First Silver Star
Sgt. Rodríguez was a member of Company F and on March 24, 1951, he led his unit to secure Hill 476.  When a camouflaged enemy machine gun opened fire on them, Rodríguez led a squad with fixed bayonets in an assault on the area from which the gunfire came from.  The enemy fled leaving their supplies behind.  For his actions, Rodríguez was awarded his first Silver Star Medal.

2nd Silver Star Medal
A week later on March 31, his company was attacking Hill 398, near Choksong-Myon, when they came under an enemy mortar barrage.  After, the enemy pinned down and inflicted heavy casualties on the lead platoon, Rodríguez was ordered to assist the stalled unit and led his platoon in an assault that routed the enemy.  For his actions, he was awarded a second Silver Star Medal.

Silver Star citations
Other U.S. Army soldiers and officers to receive more than one Silver Star for actions during the Korean War include First Lieutenant Romeo H. Bucknell Jr., First Lieutenant Smith B. Chamberlain, Second Lieutenant Robert H. Coldren, First Lieutenant Charles H. Fleming, Colonel David Haskell Hackworth, First Lieutenant Jerimiah V. Hayhurst, First Lieutenant Raymond W. King, Captain Edward A. Konek, Sergeant First Class Felix G. Nieves, Second Lieutenant Hans G. Olsen, Second Lieutenant Vidal Rodriguez-Amaro, Brigadier General Antonio Rodríguez Balinas, and Lieutenant Colonel Howard B. Sinclair.

Later years
Rodríguez retired from the Army with the rank of Master Sergeant and went to work as a mail carrier for the U.S. Postal Service in Puerto Rico. In 1979, Rodríguez went to live at the Soldier's and Airmen's Retirement Home in Washington, D.C. In 1977, he had a stroke and other medical complications including the loss of his left leg. Rodríguez died on October 19, 1999, at the age of 88, from a heart attack.  He was buried with full military honors at the Arlington National Cemetery. He was married to Asuncion Toro with whom he had five children.

Military awards and decorations
Among Rodríguez's decorations were the following:

Foreign Medal
The Bravery Gold Medal of Greece was given by the Government of Greece to the 65th Infantry Regiment and to the members of the regiment who fought in the Korean War.
  Chryssoun Aristion Andrias (Bravery Gold Medal of Greece)

Congressional Gold Medal

On June 10, 2014, President Barack Obama, signed the legislation known as  "The Borinqueneers CGM Bill" at an official ceremony. The Bill honors the 65th Infantry Regiment with the Congressional Gold Medal.

See also

List of Puerto Ricans
List of Puerto Rican military personnel
65th Infantry Regiment
Puerto Ricans in World War II
Borinqueneers Congressional Gold Medal

Notes

Further reading
Puertorriquenos Who Served With Guts, Glory, and Honor. Fighting to Defend a Nation Not Completely Their Own, Greg Boudonck; ;

External links
Pedro Rodríguez

1912 births
1999 deaths
People from Lajas, Puerto Rico
United States Army soldiers
United States Army non-commissioned officers
United States Army personnel of World War II
United States Army personnel of the Korean War
Puerto Rican Army personnel
Puerto Rico National Guard personnel
Burials at Arlington National Cemetery
Recipients of the Silver Star
United States Postal Service people